is a Japanese idol who is a former member of AKB48's Team B. In April 2017, she announced that she would be "graduating" (or leaving the group). She finally graduated on July 23, 2017.

Tanabe is currently represented by AKS. She formerly belonged to Mousa.

AKB48 discography

Singles

Albums

Stage units

Filmography

TV dramas

Variety

Films

Stage

Radio

Video games

Internet

Events

Bibliography

Magazine, newspaper serials

Calendars

Mook

References

External links 

 
 
 
 – Ameba Blog (23 June 2016 – ) 
 – Showroom 
 

AKB48 members
Japanese idols
1992 births
Living people
Musicians from Shiga Prefecture